Lamjung District, a part of Gandaki Province, is one of the 77 districts of Nepal. Lamjung lies in the mid-hills of Nepal spanning tropical to trans-Himalayan geo-ecological belts, including the geographical midpoint of the country (i.e., Duipipal). It has mixed habitation of casts and ethnicities. It is host to probably the highest density of the Gurung ethnic population in the country. 

Popular Media in Lamjung Includes Mero Lamjung, Radio Chautari, Aantaranga Saptahik, Radio Marsyangdi,Radio Lamjung etc.

Geography and climate

Demographics

At the time of the 2011 Nepal census, Lamjung District had a population of 167,724.

As first language, 58.6% spoke Nepali, 29.9% Gurung, 6.6% Tamang, 1.8% Newari, 1.0% Dura, 0.8% Magar, 0.3% Urdu, 0.2% Bhojpuri, 0.1% Kumhali, 0.1% Maithili, 0.1% Yolmo, 0.1% Rai and 0.2% other languages.

Ethnicity/caste: 31.4% were Gurung, 15.9% Chhetri, 12.8% Hill Brahmin, 8.7% Kami, 7.3% Tamang, 5.3% Sarki, 3.9% Damai/Dholi, 3.7% Newar, 2.3% Gharti/Bhujel, 2.2% Magar, 1.9% Dura, 1.0% Kumal, 0.9% Thakuri, 0.8% Sanyasi/Dasnami, 0.6% Musalman, 0.2% Rai, 0.1% Gaine, 0.1% Ghale, 0.1% Khawas, 0.1% Majhi, 0.1% Tharu, 0.1% Yolmo and 0.3% others.

Religion: 64.0% were Hindu, 33.1% Buddhist, 1.8% Christian, 0.6% Muslim and 0.4% others.

Literacy: 70.8% could read and write, 2.5% could only read and 26.6% could neither read nor write.

Rural municipalities and municipalities 

Besisahar Municipality
Dordi Rural Municipality
Dudhpokhari Rural Municipality
Kwhlosothar Rural Municipality
Madhya Nepal Municipality
Marsyandi Rural Municipality
Rainas Municipality
Sundarbazar Municipality

2015 earthquake
The epicentre of an earthquake on 25 April 2015 was near Lamjung District. Most of the major damage and casualties took place in nearby Kathmandu, Nepal's capital. The death toll was placed at over 8,800. However, only four deaths were reported in Lamjung District.

While Lamjung was the district with the 20th most deaths in Nepal, it was severely damaged. The villages of Bichaur, Ilampokhari, Dudhpokhari, Gauda, Kolki and Pyarjung were the most affected. Assistant Sub Inspector Bir Bahadur Thapa Magar identified the four deaths in Lamjung District as Lakshmi Gurung, 18, of Ilampokhari village; Nepti Tamang, 91, of Gaudu village; Sher Bahadur Tamang, 62, of Gaudu village; and three-and-a-half-month-old Sumit Bika of Gauda village. Twenty-five people were injured in Lamjung District. Local police estimate 2,094 houses were completely destroyed while another 2,129 houses were partially damaged.

References

 

 
Districts of Nepal established in 1962
Districts of Gandaki Province

bar:Gorkha (Distrikt)